The Ub (Serbian Cyrillic: Уб) is a river in western Serbia, a 57 km-long right and longest tributary to Tamnava river.

Characteristics 

The Ub originates from the Vlašić mountain in Podgorina region of west Serbia, near the village of Kasapo. From its source to the mouth, the river flows to the east, parallel to the river Tamnava, which it will eventually join.

The villages located in the upper section of the river's flow are Družetić, Pambukovica and Čučuge, where the Ub slightly turns to the north, passes through the villages of Tvrdojevac and Zvizdar, and the small town of Ub, named after the river.

The Ub continues to the north and meets the Tamnava river near the village of Šarbane. The river drains an area of 274 km², belongs to the Black Sea drainage basin and it is not navigable.

Lake Pambukovica 

In January 2021, plans for the dam and reservoir "Pambukovica" were announced. The dam will regulate high water levels during the frequent floods in the Kolubara-Tamnava basin, and will provide water for irrigation during the dry seasons. The lake will cover  and store . Construction was planned to start at the end of 2021, and to be finished in three years.

References

Sources 

 Mala Prosvetina Enciklopedija, Third edition (1985); Prosveta; 
 Jovan Đ. Marković (1990): Enciklopedijski geografski leksikon Jugoslavije Svjetlost-Sarajevo; 

Rivers of Serbia